Stereoderma may refer to two different genera:
 Stereoderma (echinoderm), a genus of sea cucumbers in the family Cucumariidae
 Stereoderma (plant), a synonym for Olea, a genus of plants